Moonland or MoonLander may refer to:

Music 
 "Moonland", a 2008 song by Nick Cave and the Bad Seeds from their album Dig, Lazarus, Dig!!!
 Moonlander (album), a 2013 studio album by Stone Gossard
 Moonlander (musical instrument), a biheaded electric guitar designed by Yuri Landman

Fictional places 
 Ithilien, a fictional region in JRR Tolkien's Middle-earth, whose name translates to "Moon-land"
 The Moonlands, a setting for the Magi-Nation Duel card game and its television adaptation

Other uses 
 A slang term for Japan, used on the internet
 Extraterrestrial real estate
Moonlander (video game), the earliest known video game with a hidden Easter egg

See also 
 Moon landing (disambiguation)